The European Space Agency (ESA) operates a number of missions, both operational and scientific, including collaborations with other national space agencies such as the Japan Aerospace Exploration Agency (JAXA), the National Centre for Space Studies (CNES), the Italian Space Agency (ASI), the German Aerospace Center (DLR), the National Aeronautics and Space Administration (NASA), and the China National Space Administration (CNSA). Their portfolio of missions also include many public-private partnership missions, a number of which with European satellite operators EUMETSAT, Eutelsat, and Inmarsat.

A staple of the ESA's Science Doctrine is the Cosmic Vision programme, a series of space science missions chosen by the ESA to launch through competitions, similar to NASA's Discovery and New Frontiers programmes. It succeeds the Horizon 2000 and Horizon 2000+ programmes which launched notable missions such as Huygens, Rosetta and Gaia. Each space science mission are divided into two categories: "Sun and Solar System", missions studying the Solar System, and "Astrophysics", missions studying interstellar astronomy. A similarly operated programme focused on Earth observation, known as the Living Planet Programme, has launched various "Earth Explorers" such as GOCE and Swarm, which serve many forms of Geoscience individually. A number of missions by the ESA have also launched and operated outside of a canonical programme, as is the case with missions such as Giotto, Ulysses, and Mars Express.

Science programmes

Horizon 2000 

Cornerstone missions
 Cornerstone 1 – SOHO, launched December 1995,  – Joint ESA-NASA Solar observation mission providing real-time data for space weather forecasting.
 Cornerstone 1 – Cluster, launched June 1996,  – Earth observation mission using four identical spacecraft to study the planet's magnetosphere. Failed on launch.
 Re-launch – Cluster II, launched July and August 2000,  – Successful replacement mission.
 Cornerstone 2 – XMM-Newton, launched December 1999,  – An X-ray space telescope, studying the full range of cosmic X-ray sources.
 Cornerstone 3 – Rosetta, launched March 2004,  – 67P/Churyumov–Gerasimenko orbiter mission, studying comets and their evolution.
 Cornerstone 4 – Herschel, launched May 2009,  – Infrared space observatory mission for general astronomy.

Medium-sized missions
 Medium 1 – Huygens, launched October 1997,  – Titan lander component of the Cassini–Huygens mission; first landing in the outer solar system.
 Medium 2 – INTEGRAL, launched October 2002,  – Gamma ray space observatory, also capable of observing X-ray and visible wavelengths.
 Medium 3 – Planck, launched May 2009,  – Cosmology mission that mapped the cosmic microwave background and its anisotropies.
Horizon 2000+

 Mission 1 – Gaia, launched December 2013,  – Astrometry mission measuring positions and distances of over one billion objects in the Milky Way. 
 Mission 2 – LISA Pathfinder, launched December 2015,  – Demonstration of technologies for the Cosmic Vision LISA Gravitational-wave observatory mission.
 Mission 3 – BepiColombo, launched October 2018,  – Joint ESA-JAXA reconnaissance mission to Mercury, using two unique spacecraft operating respectively.

Cosmic Vision 

S-class missions
 S1 – CHEOPS, launched December 2019,  – space telescope mission focused on studying known exoplanets.
 S2 – SMILE, launching 2025,  – Joint ESA-CAS Earth observation mission, studying the interaction between the planet's magnetosphere and solar wind.

M-class missions
 M1 – Solar Orbiter, launched February 2020,  – Solar observatory mission, designed to perform in-situ studies of the Sun at a perihelion of 0.28 astronomical units.
 M2 – Euclid, launching 2023,  – Visible and near-infrared space observatory mission focused on dark matter and dark energy.
 M3 – PLATO, launching 2026,  – Kepler-like space observatory mission, aimed at discovering and observing exoplanets.
 M4 – ARIEL, launching 2029,  – Planck-based space observatory mission studying the atmosphere of known exoplanets.
 M5 – EnVision, launching 2031,  – Venus mapping orbiter mission.

L-class missions
 L1 – JUICE, launching April 2023 with an orbital insertion in July 2031,  – Jupiter orbiter mission, focused on studying the Galilean moons Europa, Ganymede and Callisto.
 L2 – Athena, launching 2035,  – X-ray space observatory mission, designed as a successor to the XMM-Newton telescope.
 L3 – LISA, launching 2037,  – the first dedicated gravitational wave space observatory mission.

F-class missions
 F1 - Comet Interceptor, launching 2029,  – Comet flyby mission.
 F2 – ARRAKIHS, launching in the early 2030s,  – Survey of one hundred nearby galaxies and their surroundings to investigate dwarf galaxies and stellar streams.

Living Planet Programme 

Core missions
 Earth Explorer 1 – GOCE, launched March 2009,  — Gravimetry mission, aimed at accurately mapping Earth's gravity field.
 Earth Explorer 5 – ADM-Aeolus, launched August 2018,  – Meteorology mission, performed by a spacecraft equipped to create global wind component profiles to aid more advanced weather forecasting.
 Earth Explorer 6 – EarthCARE, launching early 2024,  – Joint ESA-JAXA meteorology and climatology mission, aimed at the characterization of clouds and aerosols, along with measurements of reflected and emitted radiation from Earth's surface.
 Earth Explorer 7 – Biomass, launching 2024,  – Ecology mission, studying the carbon cycle and forest ecology, observing the development of forests and their characteristics.
 Earth Explorer 9 – FORUM, launching 2027,  – Climatology mission, aimed at measuring far-infrared outgoing radiation emissions in order to understand Earth's surface temperature regulation.

Opportunity missions
 Earth Explorer 2 – SMOS, launched November 2009,  — Climatology mission, focused on studying Earth's water cycle and climate.
 Earth Explorer 3 – CryoSat-2, launched April 2010,  — Environmental science and glaciology mission, focused on studying Earth's polar ice caps. Successful relaunch of the failed CryoSat mission.
 Earth Explorer 4 – Swarm, launched November 2013,  — Magnetosphere mission, carried out by a trio of spacecraft launched to study Earth's magnetic field.
 Earth Explorer 8 – FLEX, launching 2025,  – Biology mission, aimed at measuring the amount of chlorophyll fluorescence in terrestrial vegetation.

Non-programme missions

Past 
 
 ARD, launched October 1998 – Demonstration mission to test new technologies in atmospheric entry design.
 CoRoT, launched December 2006 – CNES-led space telescope mission to search for rocky exoplanets and perform asteroseismology studies.
 COS-B, launched August 1975 – Gamma-ray space observatory mission organized by the European Space Research Organisation, a precursor to the ESA. The first mission launched by the ESA.
 CryoSat-1, launched October 2005 – Environmental science and glaciology mission, focused on studying Earth's polar ice caps. Failed on launch, and relaunched as CryoSat-2 in the Living Planet Programme.
 Double Star, launched December 2003 and July 2004 – Joint CNSA-ESA Earth observation mission to study the planet's magnetosphere, complementing the Horizon 2000 Cluster mission.
 ECS family, launched June 1983 to July 1988 – Joint Eutelsat-ESA mission to launch the first generation of EUTELSAT telecommunication satellites.
 Envisat, launched March 2002 – Earth observation mission focused on environmental studies, using the largest civilian Earth observation satellite ever launched.
 ERS-1 and ERS-2, launched July 1991 and April 1995 – ESA's first Earth observation missions.
 EURECA, launched August 1992 – microgravity testbed mission carrying a suite of fifteen instruments from various European national space administrations.
 EXOSAT, launched May 1983 – ESA's first X-ray space observatory mission.
 GEOS-1 and GEOS-2, launched April 1977 and July 1978 – Magnetospheric reconnaissance mission, consisting experimental payloads by various European national space administrations.
 Giotto, launched July 1985 – First interplanetary mission by the ESA, aimed at performing the first comet flyby, of Comet Halley. Part of the canonical Halley Armada.
 GIOVE-A, launched December 2005 – Demonstration mission testing technologies for the Galileo satellite navigation system.
 Hipparcos, launched August 1989 – First astrometry mission ever launched, focused on cataloguing over 118,200 stars in the eponymous Hipparcos Catalogue, published in 1997.
 ISEE-2, launched October 1977 – ESA component of the Joint NASA-ESA International Sun-Earth Explorer series of magnetospheric observations.
 ISO, launched November 1995 – Infrared space observatory mission for general astronomy.
 IXV, launched February 2015 – Experimental suborbital re-entry vehicle; demonstration mission for reusable launchers.
 IUE, launched January 1978 – Joint NASA-ESA-SERC ultraviolet space observatory mission for general astronomy.
 MARECS family, launched December 1981 to November 1984 – Joint Inmarsat-ESA program which launched a satellite duo to create a global maritime communications network. MARECS B failed on launch.
 Olympus, launched July 1989 – telecommunications mission pioneering high-power transmitters, multi-spot beam Ka band technology and on-board switching.
 OTS-1 and OTS-2, launched September 1977 and May 1978 – Demonstration mission for a geostationary communications satellite system. OTS-1 was lost in a launch failure.
 SSETI Express, launched October 2005 – Student demonstration mission, sponsored by the ESA Education Office, which launched three CubeSats to take pictures of the Earth and serve as a radio transponder.
 Schiaparelli, launched March 2016 – Demonstration mission for landing technologies designed for the ExoMars surface platform. Failed upon landing on Mars.
 SMART-1, launched September 2003 – Demonstration mission for solar electric propulsion, manifesting in a lunar orbiter mission carrying low-cost, miniaturised instruments.
 Ulysses, launched October 1990 – Joint ESA-NASA Solar observatory mission, employing a spacecraft in a polar heliocentric orbit.
 Venus Express, launched November 2005 – Venus orbiter mission, focused on long-term study and observation of its atmosphere from polar cytherocentric orbit.
 YES2, launched September 2007 – Student demonstration mission, sponsored by the ESA Education Office, which deployed a 31.7 km-long space tethered constellation of satellites. Partial launch failure.
 Meteosat (first generation), launched November 1977 to September 1997 – Joint EUMETSAT-ESA meteorology mission consisting seven geostationary satellites launched over a period of twenty years. Meteosat-7 re-orbiting commenced on 3-April-2017.
 GIOVE-B, launched April 2008 – Second demonstration mission testing technologies for the Galileo satellite navigation system. Retired in 2012.

Current 

 
 Alphasat, launched July 2013 – Joint Inmarsat-ESA mission to launch an advanced geostationary communication satellite to serve Africa, Asia and Europe; the largest ever built by Europe.
 EDRS, launched January 2016 to 2017 – Geosynchronous optical communication network consisting a constellation of two satellites, EDRS-A and EDRS-C.
 Galileo, launched October 2011 onward – Joint ESA-GSA geodesy project to create an indigenous global navigation satellite system independent of the Russian GLONASS, Chinese BeiDou and American GPS systems.
 Hubble, launched April 1990 – Joint NASA-ESA-STScl space observatory mission, carried out by a near ultraviolet, visible, and near infrared telescope.
 James Webb Space Telescope, launched in December 2021 – Joint NASA-ESA-CSA infrared space observatory mission for general astronomy and cosmology.
 Mars Express, launched June 2003 – Mars orbiter mission focused on observing the planet through high-resolution imagery and conducting research of the planet's interaction with the solar system. 
 MSG, launched January 2004 to July 2015 – Joint EUMETSAT-ESA meteorology mission to launch the second generation of Meteosat satellites, of which four were launched over a period of eleven years.
 MetOp (first generation), launched October 2006 to 2018 – Joint EUMETSAT-ESA operational meteorology mission consisting three satellites launched over a period of twelve years. 
 PROBA-1, launched October 2001 – Microsatellite earth observation and Low Earth Orbit technology demonstration mission for various new instruments.
 PROBA-2, launched November 2009 – Microsatellite earth observation and Low Earth Orbit technology demonstration mission, serving as the second flight in the Proba series.
 PROBA-V, launched May 2013 – Microsatellite earth observation mission focused on mapping land cover and vegetation growth across Earth in bi-daily cycles; the third mission in the Proba series.
 Sentinel family, launched April 2014 onward – Suite of Earth observation missions serving as the ESA's contribution to the European Commission's Copernicus Programme.
 Trace Gas Orbiter, launched March 2016 – Mars orbiter component of the ExoMars astrobiology mission, focused on observing methane in the planet's atmosphere for clues to past or present life on Mars.

Future 
 MTG, launching ~2022 onward – Joint EUMETSAT-ESA meteorology mission to launch the third generation of Meteosat satellites.
 PROBA-3, launching in 2024 – Microsatellite solar observation and formation flying demonstration mission, serving as the fourth flight in the Proba series.
 Electra, launching in 2023 – Joint ESA-SES telecommunications mission, utilizing a spacecraft with electrical-powered propulsion.
 MetOp-SG, launching ~2025 onward – Joint EUMETSAT-ESA operational meteorology mission, launching the second generation of MetOp satellites, of which a constellation of six will be launched.
 Hera, launching October 2024 – European component of AIDA, a NASA-ESA asteroid deflection test cooperation, aimed at studying the effects of the NEO's impact created by NASA's DART mission using 65803 Didymos's moon (Dimorphos) as a target.
 Vigil, launching ~2027 – ESA space weather mission.
 Rosalind Franklin rover, launching ~2028 – ESA component of the formerly joint Roscosmos-ESA ExoMars Mars lander mission. Planned to be the first European Mars rover.

Proposed 
 LOFT – X-ray space observatory mission focused on the study of high-mass objects such as black holes and neutron stars. Finalist for the M3 slot in the Cosmic Vision programme, but lost to PLATO.
 Lunar Lander, proposed launch in 2018 – Demonstration mission aimed at testing new technologies in lunar landing, including autonomous redirects. Project put on hold due to lack of financial support, as of 2012.
 Marco Polo – a sample-return mission focused on collecting and returning a sample from a Near-Earth object. Proposed for the M1, M2, M3, M4 and M5 missions of the Cosmic Vision programme, it has since been rejected all five times.
 ODINUS – A dual Uranus and Neptune orbital mission. Proposed for the L2 and L3 missions of the Cosmic Vision programme, but eliminated from the running both times.
 STE-QUEST – Astrophysics demonstration mission focused on testing the equivalence principle. Finalist for the M3 slot in the Cosmic Vision programme, but lost to PLATO.

Cancelled 
 Darwin – Proposed exoplanetary science mission focused on directly detecting Earth-like exoplanets. Proposed as a cornerstone for the Horizon 2000+ programme, but abandoned in 2007.
 Don Quijote – Concept for a demonstration mission, testing technologies in asteroid deflection. Abandoned after lack of interest from the ESA.
 EChO – Space observatory mission aimed at exoplanetary science, employing high resolution, multi-wavelength spectroscopic observations. Finalist for the M3 slot in the Cosmic Vision programme, but lost to PLATO. Succeeded by ARIEL as the M4 mission.
 Eddington – Concept for an asteroseismology mission designed to detect exoplanets. Cancelled in 2003.
 EXPERT – Concept for a flying hypersonic re-entry vehicle with cooperation with Roscosmos. Indefinitely postponed since 2012, due to Roscosmos' withdrawal from the project.
 Hermes – Proposed human spaceflight program centered around a CNES-designed reusable spaceplane. Project cancelled in 1992 due to difficulties with achieving financial and scientific goals.
 Hopper – Successor concept to Hermes. Cancelled in 2005 after lack of interest.

See also 

List of NASA missions
List of ISRO missions

References

External links 

 European Space Agency Cosmos portal – Official website of the ESA Science Directorate
 ESA Science and Technology – Scientific community portal for ESA missions
 ESA's Cosmic Vision – The current ESA science mission program
 

programs and missions

European Space Agency